Natividad Vacío (September 8, 1912 – May 30, 1996) was an American character actor in films and television from the 1950s through the 1980s. Born Natividad Domínguez Vacío in El Paso, Texas, he was Mexican-American. He nearly always played a Hispanic character in his 65 film and television appearances. He was married to Henriqueta (Queta) Vacío.

Career
His debut came in a 1950 episode of The Lone Ranger called "Dead Man's Chest". He was featured in The Hitch-Hiker (1953), a film noir directed by Ida Lupino. Many of his roles were in Westerns, although he had a diverse career. For example, he played a character called "Frank Smith" who was the family gardener in five episodes of the suburban sitcom Father Knows Best.

The majority of his work was in television, with an occasional movie role. Perhaps the highest-profile film in which he appeared was The Magnificent Seven (1960), portraying "Miguel", one of the Mexican townspeople trying to defend their farming village from a band of outlaws. In 1988, he appeared in a Robert Redford film called Milagro Beanfield War (1988) where he portrayed "Onofre", a man with one arm, who said his arm was eaten off by butterflies. He was one of the four men they called the "senile brigade".

Vacío was a close friend of actor George Reeves, star of the TV series Adventures of Superman. Vacío played the role of a Mexican police inspector in the 1958 episode "The Brainy Burro". Vacío and Reeves met at Pasadena Junior College, and Reeves loved to hear "Nati", Vacío's nickname, sing and play his guitar. Reeves asked Nati to show him how to play. Reeves was a quick learner and both of them would play and sing Mexican songs, all the time.

In Hollywoodland (2006), a film about Reeves' life and death, the character of Vacío was portrayed by Diego Fuentes, Toronto actor/socialite, in a couple of scenes.

Filmography

References

External links

1912 births
1996 deaths
Male actors from El Paso, Texas
American male actors of Mexican descent
American male television actors
American male film actors
20th-century American male actors